Igor Gomes Silva (born 6 March 2001) is a Brazilian footballer who plays as a defender for Internacional.

Career
As a youth player, Gomes joined the youth academy of Coimbra. In 2019, he joined the youth academy of Barcelona in the Spanish La Liga.

In 2022, he signed for Brazilian club Internacional.

References

External links

 

2001 births
Association football defenders
Brazil youth international footballers
Brazilian expatriate footballers
Brazilian expatriate sportspeople in Spain
Brazilian footballers
Expatriate footballers in Spain
FC Barcelona Atlètic players
Living people
Segunda División B players
Sport Club Internacional players
People from Barra Mansa